Father of Asahd is the eleventh studio album by American hip hop producer DJ Khaled. It was released on May 17, 2019, through We the Best Music and Epic Records. It features the singles "Top Off" and "No Brainer" along with collaborations with Cardi B, 21 Savage and Meek Mill. On May 16, DJ Khaled revealed the track listing and features, as well as that the music videos for "Higher", "Just Us", "Celebrate", "Jealous" and "Holy Mountain" would be released throughout the day of May 17, followed by the video for "You Stay" on May 18, and "Wish Wish" and "Weather the Storm" on May 20. DJ Khaled scored his third career Grammy nomination with "Higher" which won the Best Rap/Sung Performance at the 62nd Grammy Awards.

Background
In March 2018, DJ Khaled announced the title, upon releasing the lead single, called "Top Off". He named the album after his eldest child, Asahd Tuck Khaled. In March 2019, he announced the release date, while in the meantime, promoting the album extensively on his social media accounts. He also posted a trailer for the album. DJ Khaled has also teased numerous collaborations on his social media, which, along with Future, Jay-Z and Beyoncé on "Top Off", and Justin Bieber, Chance the Rapper and Quavo on "No Brainer", include J Balvin, Cardi B, Meek Mill, Post Malone, Travis Scott, Chief Keef, Bryson Tiller, Sizzla, and 2 Chainz. In April 2019, TMZ reported that "Higher" featuring Nipsey Hussle and John Legend would appear on the album. DJ Khaled, Nipsey Hussle, and John Legend shot the music video before Nipsey's death on March 31, 2019.

Critical reception

Father of Asahd received mixed reviews among critics. On Metacritic which assigns a rating of up to 100, the album received an average of 59, indicating "Mixed or average reviews" based on 7 critics.

Andy Kellman of AllMusic gave the album 3.5 stars out of 5 and also noted in his review on the album by saying "Although instant, maximum commercial impact is no doubt the primary objective, the album does come across as more considered than the average Khaled LP."

Commercial performance
Father of Asahd debuted at number two on the US Billboard 200 with 136,000 album-equivalent units, with 34,000 copies as pure album sales in its first week. In the second week, the album remained at number two on the chart, earning an additional 58,000 album-equivalent units. In its third week, the album dropped to number three on the chart, earning 39,000 more units. In its fourth week, the album dropped to number eight on the chart, earning 31,000 more units, bringing its four-week total to 264,000 album-equivalent units. On May 17, 2020, the album was certified platinum by the Recording Industry Association of America (RIAA) for combined sales and album-equivalent units of over 1,000,000 units in the United States.

Controversy
On June 5, 2019, sources reported DJ Khaled was fuming at his label after Father of Asahd failed to debut at the top of the Billboard 200. He reportedly blamed his label chiefs for not understanding streaming services and bundle deals, in connection with an estimated 100,000 downloads of his album that were sold through a bundle deal with an energy drink that weren't included in his sales by Billboard. Father of Asahd debuted behind American rapper and record producer Tyler, the Creator's fifth studio album, Igor.

On June 6, DJ Khaled posted a now-deleted video on his Instagram page that many believe was aimed at Tyler, the Creator after his album beat out Father of Asahd for the number one spot on the Billboard charts. In the video, Khaled stated, "Here's the thing, I make albums so people can play it. And you actually hear it. You know, driving your car you hear another car playing it. Go to the barber shop, you hear them playing it. You know, turn the radio on, and you hear them playing it. It's playing everywhere - it's called great music. It's called albums that you actually hear the songs. Not no mysterious shit, and you never hear it." Many people took the "mysterious shit" line to be about Tyler, who responded on Twitter when a follower told him, "Wow doin pretty good for some mysterious shit." Tyler told the follower, "yeah i am, IGOR OUT NOW."

On June 10, sources reported DJ Khaled was planning a "monster lawsuit" against Billboard, alleging the organization unfairly disqualified more than 100,000 sales of Father of Asahd from the No. 1 spot.

Track listing
Credits adapted from Tidal.

Notes
  signifies a co-producer
  signifies a miscellaneous producer
  signifies an uncredited additional producer

Sample credits
 "Holy Mountain" contains a sample from "One Spliff a Day", written by Henry Lawes and Billy Rowe, as performed by Billy Boyo.
 “Jealous” contain a sample from “Shy Guy” written by Diana King, Kingsley Gardner, and Andrew Saidenberg, as performed by Diana King.
 "Just Us" contain a sample from "Ms. Jackson", written by André Benjamin, Antwan Patton, and David Sheats, as performed by OutKast.
 "Freak n You" contain a sample from "Freek'n You", written by Donald DeGrate, Jr., as performed by Jodeci.
 "Holy Ground" contains a sample from "To Zion", written by Charles Fox, and Norman Gimbel, performed by Lauryn Hill.

Personnel
Credits adapted from Tidal.

Musicians
 Maxime Breton – guitar 
 Leah Marie – background vocals 
 Nicky Burt – background vocals 
 Adina Myrie – background vocals 

Technical
 Juan "AyoJuan" Peña – recording 
 Oscar Moncada – recording 
 Vychalle Singh – recording 
 Justus Arison – recording 
 Mac Akkitson – recording 
 Patrizio Pigliapoco – recording 
 Hector Castro – recording 
 Rich Harris – recording 
 David Kim – recording 
 Anthony Cruz – recording 
 Louis Bell – recording 
 Joe Zarrillo – recording 
 Vincent Mayfield – recording 
 Garnett "G" Flynn – recording 
 Thomas "Tomcat" Bennett – recording 
 Manny Galvez – recording , engineering assistant , recording 
 Gimel "Young Guru" Keaton – recording 
 Jeff Lane – recording 
 Brendan Morawaski – recording 
 Josh Gudwin – recording 
 Manny Marroquin – mixing 
 Chris Galland – mixing 
 Lu Diaz – mixing 
 Chris Athens – mastering 
 OP! – engineering 
 Chris "TEK" O'Ryan – engineering 
 Ashley Jackson – engineering assistant 
 Carol Dexter – engineering assistant  
 Gregg Rominiecki – engineering assistant , recording 
 Omar Loya – engineering assistant 
 Robin Florent – engineering assistant 
 Scott Desmarais – engineering assistant 
 Jeremie Inhaber – engineering assistant 
 Hotae Alexander Jang – vocal engineering 
 Khaled Khaled – vocal production

Charts

Weekly charts

Year-end charts

Certifications

References

2019 albums
DJ Khaled albums
Albums produced by Beyoncé
Albums produced by Cool & Dre
Albums produced by DJ Khaled
Albums produced by Frank Dukes
Albums produced by Louis Bell
Albums produced by Poo Bear
Albums produced by Rashad Smith
Albums produced by Tay Keith